Richard Lee Beasley (1930 – December 28, 2012) was an American politician. Beasley was the father of former Governor of South Carolina David Beasley and was chairman of a bank. He served in the South Carolina House of Representatives from 1960 to 1966.

Notes

1930 births
2012 deaths
Members of the South Carolina House of Representatives
People from Darlington, South Carolina